The 1974–75 snooker season was a series of snooker tournaments played between August 1974 and May 1975. The following table outlines the results for the season's events.


Calendar

Notes

References

1974
Season 1974
Season 1975